The Vinerian Scholarship is a scholarship given to the University of Oxford student who "gives the best performance in the examination for the degree of Bachelor of Civil Law".

The Vinerian Scholarship is the most prestigious law scholarship awarded by the University of Oxford. Past award holders have distinguished themselves in the judiciary, legal practice, academia, civil service and in other fields. The list of scholars includes four Law Lords (Lord Uthwatt, Lord Hoffmann, Lord Edmund-Davies and Lord Saville), and justices of the highest courts in Australia (Dyson Heydon and Patrick Keane), Canada (Ronald Martland) and South Africa (Edwin Cameron).

Vinerian scholars
Past winners of the Vinerian Scholarship include:
 
 Charles Abbott, 1st Baron Tenterden
 Sir Thomas Plumer, MR (1777), University College, Oxford
 John Taylor Coleridge (1812)
 Nassau William Senior (1813)
 Frederic Rogers, Baron Blachford (1834), Oriel College, Oxford
 Thomas Henry Haddan (1838) Christ Church, Oxford
Richard Harington (1858), Christ Church, Oxford
Robert Kenyon (1872), Christ Church, Oxford
 Sir William Cameron Gull, 2nd Baronet of Brook Street (1883), Christ Church, Oxford
Henry Straus Quixano Henriques (1891), Worcester College, Oxford
F. E. Smith, 1st Earl of Birkenhead (1896), Wadham College, Oxford
Owyn Murray (1897), Exeter College, Oxford
 Francis de Zulueta (1903), New College, Oxford
 Augustus Uthwatt, Baron Uthwatt (1904 joint), University of Melbourne – Balliol College, Oxford
Frederick Barrington-Ward (1904 joint), Hertford College, Oxford
 John Clifford Valentine Behan (1906), University of Melbourne – Hertford College, Oxford
George Johnston (1909), Christ Church, Oxford
 Henry Angus (1914), Balliol College, Oxford
Suspended for World War I (1916 – 1920)
 Harold Hanbury (1921), Brasenose College, Oxford
 Cyril Pearce Harvey (1923), Brasenose College, Oxford
 Lord Edmund-Davies (1929), King's College London – Exeter College, Oxford
Change in statute to award scholarship on the basis of BCL examinations (1928)
 Ronald Martland (1931), University of Alberta – Hertford College, Oxford
 John Gabriel Starke (1934), University of Western Australia – Exeter College, Oxford
Alan Brock Brown (1935), New College, Oxford
 (William) Reginald Verdon-Smith (1936) – Brasenose College, Oxford
 Norman Marsh (1937) – Pembroke College, Oxford
Suspended for World War II (1940 – 1945)
 Zelman Cowen (1947 joint), Melbourne Law School – New College, Oxford
 Rex Welsh (1947 joint), University of the Witwatersrand – Oriel College, Oxford
 Tony Honoré (1948 joint), New College, Oxford
 William Lederman (1948 joint), University of Saskatchewan – Exeter College, Oxford
 Peter Carter (1949), Oriel College, Oxford
Anthony Machin (1950), New College, Oxford
 Ian Brownlie (1952), Hertford College, Oxford
 Allan Gotlieb (1953), University of California, Berkeley – Christ Church, Oxford
Laurence Libbert (1954), Magdalen College, Oxford
 Leonard Hubert Hoffmann, Lord Hoffmann (1957), University of Cape Town – The Queen's College, Oxford
 Brian Shaw (1958), University of Melbourne – Magdalen College, Oxford
 Colin Tapper (1959), Magdalen College, Oxford
Mark Saville, Baron Saville (1960), Brasenose College, Oxford
 Robert Roy Stuart (1961), University of Alberta – Wadham College, Oxford
 Richard Buxton (1962), Exeter College, Oxford
 Jeffrey Hackney (1963), Wadham College, Oxford
 John Eekelaar (1965), King's College London – University College, Oxford
 John Dyson Heydon (1967), University College, Oxford – University College, Oxford
 Ross Alan Sundberg (1969) University of Melbourne – Magdalen College, Oxford
 Michael Hart (1970), Magdalen College, Oxford
 Mark Weinberg (1972), Monash University Faculty of Law
 Kenneth Parker (1973) Exeter College, Oxford
 Paul Craig (1974), Worcester College, Oxford
 Hugh Collins (1975), Pembroke College, Oxford
 Peter Cane (1976), Sydney Law School – Magdalen College, Oxford
 Patrick Keane (1977), University of Queensland – Magdalen College, Oxford
Stephen Moriarty (1978), Brasenose College, Oxford
 Michael Hoyle  (1979) University of Melbourne – Magdalen College, Oxford
 Mary Stokes (1980), Brasenose College, Oxford
 Edwin Cameron (1982), University of Stellenbosch – Keble College, Oxford
 Norman O'Bryan (1983), Melbourne Law School – Wadham College, Oxford
Edward Braham (1984), Worcester College, Oxford
Craig Orr (1985), Downing College, Cambridge – University College, Oxford
 Timothy Pitt-Payne (1986 joint), Worcester College, Oxford
 John Gardner (1987), New College, Oxford – New College, Oxford
 Graham Virgo (1988), Downing College, Cambridge – Christ Church, Oxford
 Paul Nicholls (1990), University of Sheffield – Worcester College, Oxford
 Andrew Palmer (1992), Monash University – St John's College, Oxford
 Andrew Bell (1993), Sydney Law School – Magdalen College, Oxford
Andrew Dickinson (1994), St Edmund Hall, Oxford
 Jeremy Kirk (1996), Australian National University – Magdalen College, Oxford
 Ann Buckingham (1997), Victoria University of Wellington
 Henry Forbes Smith (1998 joint), University of Otago – Merton College, Oxford
 Angus Johnston (1999), Brasenose College, Oxford – Brasenose College, Oxford
 Stephen Free (2000), Australian National University – Magdalen College, Oxford
 Burton Ong (2001), National University of Singapore – Merton College, Oxford
 David Murray (2002), Christ Church, Oxford – Christ Church, Oxford
 Ben Allgrove (2003), University of Adelaide – Magdalen College, Oxford
Tamsyn Allen (2004), Magdalen College, Oxford
 Andrew Scott (2005 joint), St John's College, Oxford
 Marc Brown (2005 joint), Mansfield College, Oxford
 Paul Adams (2006), St Catherine's College, Oxford – St Catherine's College, Oxford
 Imran Afzal (2007), Merton College, Oxford – Merton College, Oxford
 Natasha Bennett (2008), Trinity College, Cambridge – Merton College, Oxford
 Michael Bolding (2009), Melbourne Law School – Lincoln College, Oxford
 Frederick Wilmot-Smith (2010), Christ's College, Cambridge – Balliol College, Oxford
 Niranjan Venkatesan (2011), National Law School of India University – Magdalen College, Oxford
 Naomi Oreb (2012), Sydney Law School – Magdalen College, Oxford
 Ajay Ratan (2013), Downing College, Cambridge – Trinity College, Oxford
 James Ruddell (2014), University of Auckland – Merton College, Oxford
 Owen Lloyd (2015), Merton College, Oxford – Merton College, Oxford
 Marlena Valles (2016), The University of Edinburgh – Jesus College, Oxford
 Tristan Cummings (2017), Merton College, Oxford – Merton College, Oxford
 Christopher Stackpoole (2018), Queensland University of Technology – Merton College, Oxford
Chen Chen (2019 joint) Magdalen College, Oxford – Merton College, Oxford
Luca Moretti (2019 joint) University of Sydney – Christ Church, Oxford
Alyssa Glass (2020), University of Sydney - Magdalen College, Oxford
Edward Mordaunt (2021), St Cross College, Oxford
Ruben Robertson (2022),University of Sydney - Magdalen College, Oxford

Vinerian proxime accessit award holders 

 Chloe Carpenter (2000 joint), King's College London - Brasenose College, Oxford
 Catherine Button (2000 joint), University of Melbourne - Magdalen College, Oxford
 Zachary Douglas (2001 joint), University of Melbourne - Lincoln College, Oxford
 Aaron Baker (2001 joint), Saint Louis University - St Peter's College, Oxford
 Mario Mendez (2002), Queen Mary University of London - St Catherine's College, Oxford
 Benjamin Doyle (2003), University of Adelaide - Magdalen College, Oxford
 Rupert Allen (2006), Gonville and Caius College, Cambridge - Merton College, Oxford
 Matthias Kuscher (2007), Clare College, Cambridge - Merton College, Oxford
 Patrick Hayden (2008), Magdalen College, Oxford
 Henry Philips (2009), Worcester College, Oxford
 Catherine Fleming (2010), University College, Oxford
 Alice Irving (2011), University of Otago - Merton College, Oxford
 Colm O'Grady (2013), London School of Economics - Pembroke College, Oxford
 Jack Williams (2014), St Catharine's College, Cambridge - Hertford College, Oxford
 Anthony Wicks (2015), University of Otago - St Cross College, Oxford
 Daniel Fletcher (2016), University of Sydney - Magdalen College, Oxford
 Man Hin Chan (2017 joint), Oriel College, Oxford
 Sinziana Hennig (2017 joint), University of Toronto - St Catherine's College, Oxford
 Chen Xun Chua (2018), Gonville and Caius College, Cambridge - Corpus Christi College, Oxford
 Joshua Underwood (2019 joint), University of Queensland - St Edmund Hall, Oxford
 Ashpen Rajah (2019 joint), Downing College, Cambridge - Trinity College, Oxford
 Alice Zhou (2020 joint), University of Sydney - Christ Church, Oxford
 Elizabeth Huang (2020 joint), Trinity College, Cambridge - Magdalen College, Oxford
 Maxwell Davie (2021), Monash University - Mansfield College, Oxford

References

Awards and prizes of the University of Oxford
Lists of people associated with the University of Oxford